Christian Rocca (born 23 January 1968) is an Italian newspaper journalist and blogger.

Life and career 
After graduating in Jurisprudence, at Università Cattolica del Sacro Cuore in Milan, he started his political activity with the Radical Party (Italy) of Marco Pannella and Emma Bonino; in 1991 he was also the Parliamentary assistant of Peppino Calderisi.

Some years later he devoted himself to journalism with Il Foglio of Giuliano Ferrara, since its foundation; he is also a correspondent for Il Sole 24 Ore and writes on Vanity Fair, mainly dealing with American and International politics.
Until December 2013 he has written a music column, entitled Gommalacca, on the Sunday Sole 24 ORE, and since February 2012 he is the director of the magazine IL, the monthly insert of the same newspaper.

Since 2002 he has held a newspaper blog, Camilloblog.it, which has reached the first position in the International classification of Wikio. As a writer, he is the author of the essay Sulle strade di Barney (2010), a voyage into the world of Mordecai Richler, the author of Barney's Version (novel).

Controversies 
On 4 October 2012 Rocca polemicized on Twitter with Massimo Bordin, who, during the radio broadcast Stampa e regime, revealed Rocca's frequentations with Nicolò Pollari and Pio Pompa at the Sismi headquarters relating the articles written about the Nigergate case.
On the following day the strife was commented, on Il Foglio, by Giuliano Ferrara who asserts that Rocca's sources were "the official reports of the American Senate and of the various commissions of inquiry of the United Kingdom about the different scandals linked to that event", and that the meeting with Pollari and Pompa had taken place only after the publication of the articles.

Vice versa the newspapers la Repubblica and il Fatto Quotidiano, quoting the same article written by Ferrara, speak about a campaign of disinformation in favour of SISMI against the surveys carried out by Giuseppe D'Avanzo and Carlo Bonini on the Nigergate.

Works 
 Esportare l'America. La rivoluzione democratica dei neoconservatori, I libri de Il Foglio, 2003.
 Contro l'ONU. Il fallimento delle Nazioni Unite e la formidabile idea di un'alleanza tra le democrazie, Edizioni Lindau, 2005, .
 Cambiare regime. La sinistra e gli ultimi 45 dittatori, Einaudi, 2006, .
 Sulle strade di Barney, Bompiani, 2010.
 Chiudete internet. Una modesta proposta, Marsilio, 2019, .

References

Sources 
Francesco Melia e Gaetano Stellino (a cura di), Lo frutto, i 150 anni del Liceo Classico di Alcamo, Campo, Alcamo, 2012, p. 151

Italian bloggers
Male bloggers
1968 births
21st-century Italian writers
People from Alcamo
Living people